Berettyóújfalu is a district in south-eastern part of Hajdú-Bihar County. Berettyóújfalu is also the name of the town where the district seat is found. The district is located in the Northern Great Plain Statistical Region. This district is a part of Bihar historical and geographical region.

Geography 
Berettyóújfalu District borders with Derecske District to the north, the Romanian county of Bihor to the east, Sarkad District (Békés County) to the south, Szeghalom District (Békés County) and Püspökladány District to the west. The number of the inhabited places in Berettyóújfalu District is 25.

Municipalities 
The district has 3 towns, 2 large villages and 20 villages.
(ordered by population, as of 1 January 2012)

The bolded municipalities are cities, italics municipalities are large villages.

Demographics

In 2011, it had a population of 44,995 and the population density was 36/km².

Ethnicity
Besides the Hungarian majority, the main minorities are the Roma (approx. 3,000), Romanian (1,000) and German (200).

Total population (2011 census): 44,995
Ethnic groups (2011 census): Identified themselves: 42,143 persons:
Hungarians: 38,009 (90.19%)
Gypsies: 2,694 (6.39%)
Romanians: 1,111 (2.64%)
Others and indefinable: 329 (0.78%)
Approx. 3,000 persons in Berettyóújfalu District did not declare their ethnic group at the 2011 census.

Religion
Religious adherence in the county according to 2011 census:

Reformed – 19,399;
Catholic – 3,480 (Roman Catholic – 2,996; Greek Catholic – 484);
Orthodox – 618;
Evangelical – 86;
other religions – 675;
Non-religious – 9,703; 
Atheism – 262;
Undeclared – 10,772.

Gallery

See also
List of cities and towns of Hungary

References

External links
 Postal codes of the Berettyóújfalu District

Districts in Hajdú-Bihar County
Berettyóújfalu